The 1900 United States presidential election was the 29th quadrennial presidential election, held on Tuesday, November 6, 1900. In a re-match of the 1896 race, incumbent Republican President William McKinley defeated his Democratic challenger, William Jennings Bryan. McKinley's victory made him the first president to win a consecutive re-election since Ulysses S. Grant had accomplished the same feat in 1872. Until 1956, this would be the last time in which an incumbent Republican president would win re-election after serving a full term in office. This election saw the fifth rematch in presidential history, something that would also not occur again until 1956. This was also the first rematch to produce the same winner both times.

McKinley and Bryan each faced little opposition within their own party. Although some Gold Democrats explored the possibility of a campaign by Admiral George Dewey, Bryan was easily re-nominated at the 1900 Democratic National Convention after Dewey withdrew from the race. McKinley was unanimously re-nominated at the 1900 Republican National Convention. As Vice President Garret Hobart had died in 1899, the Republican convention chose New York Governor Theodore Roosevelt as McKinley's running mate.

The return of economic prosperity and recent victory in the Spanish–American War helped McKinley to score a decisive victory, while Bryan's anti-imperialist stance and continued support for bimetallism attracted only limited support. McKinley carried most states outside of the Solid South and won 51.6% of the popular vote. The election results were similar to those of 1896, though McKinley picked up several Western states and Bryan picked up Kentucky.

Six months into his second term, McKinley was assassinated in September 1901 and was succeeded by Vice President Roosevelt.

Nominations

Republican Party nomination

The 926 delegates to the Republican convention, which met in Philadelphia on June 19–21, re-nominated President William McKinley by acclamation. Thomas C. Platt, the "boss" of the New York State Republican Party, did not like Theodore Roosevelt, New York's popular governor, even though he was a fellow Republican. Roosevelt's efforts to reform New York politics – including Republican politics – led Platt and other state Republican leaders to pressure President McKinley to accept Roosevelt as his new vice presidential candidate, thus filling the spot left open when Vice President Garret Hobart died in 1899. By electing Roosevelt vice president, Platt would remove Roosevelt from New York state politics. Although Roosevelt was reluctant to accept the nomination for vice president, which he regarded as a relatively trivial and powerless office, his great popularity among most Republican delegates led McKinley to pick him as his new running mate. Quite unexpectedly, Roosevelt would be elevated to the presidency in September 1901, when McKinley was assassinated in Buffalo, New York.

Democratic Party nomination

Other candidates

After Admiral George Dewey's return from the Spanish–American War, many suggested that he run for president on the Democratic ticket. Dewey, however, had already angered some Protestants by marrying the Catholic Mildred McLean Hazen (the widow of General William Babcock Hazen and daughter of Washington McLean, owner of The Washington Post) in November 1899 and giving her the house that the nation had given him following the war. His candidacy was also almost immediately plagued by a number of public relations gaffes. Newspapers started attacking him as naïve after he was quoted as saying the job of president would be easy, since the chief executive was merely following orders in executing the laws enacted by Congress, and that he would "execute the laws of Congress as faithfully as I have always executed the orders of my superiors." Shortly thereafter, he admitted never having voted in a presidential election before, mentioning that the only man he ever would have voted for, had he voted, would have been Grover Cleveland. He drew even more criticism when he offhandedly (and prophetically) told a newspaper reporter that, "Our next war will be with Germany."

Dewey's campaign was met with a level of pessimism by Gold Democrats on whose support his campaign depended. Some even threw their support to Bryan, since they believed him to be the stronger candidate. As early as three days into his candidacy, his campaign having been damaged by the aforementioned missteps, rumors abounded regarding Dewey's impending withdrawal which proved false. Further injuries, however, were made when it became clear that the Democratic Party leaders of Vermont were hostile to Dewey and wholly committed to Bryan. Ohio similarly went for Bryan, though with the caveat there that some leaders suggested that all mention to silver in the party platform be dropped. By May 5, John Roll McLean, the brother-in-law of and effective campaign manager for Dewey, defected from the campaign and was widely considered to now be silently supporting Bryan. By May 17, Dewey recognized that there was very little chance for him to gather enough delegates among the Western and Southern states to possibly keep Bryan from attaining two-thirds of the delegates at the convention, publicly commenting that he no longer even knew why he had decided to run for president at all; He effectively withdrew around this time. After this there was a major boom for his nomination as vice president on the ticket alongside Bryan; however Dewey resolutely refused to be considered.

William Jennings Bryan was faced with little real opposition after Dewey withdrew from the race. Bryan won at the 1900 Democratic National Convention held at Kansas City, Missouri, on July 4–6, garnering 936 delegate votes for the nomination.

Official or speculated candidates for the vice-presidential nomination:

 Adlai Stevenson I, Former Vice President and former Representative from Illinois
 Charles A. Towne, Former Representative from Minnesota
 Elliott Danforth, Former Democratic State Committee Chairman from New York
 William Sulzer, Representative from New York
 Joseph C. Sibley, Representative from Pennsylvania
 Robert E. Pattison, Former Governor of Pennsylvania
 George F. Williams, Former Representative from Massachusetts
 James P. Tarvin, Judge from Kentucky
 George B. McClellan Jr., Representative from New York
 John W. Daniel, Senator and Former Representative from Virginia
 John J. Lentz, Representative from Ohio
 Carter Harrison Jr., Mayor of Chicago, Illinois
 John W. Keller, Charities Commissioner of New York City, from New York

 David B. Hill, Former Senator from and former Governor of New York
 John Walter Smith, Representative from Maryland
 Jim Hogg, Former Governor of Texas
 Edward Atkinson, Economist and founding member of the American Anti-Imperialist League from Massachusetts
 Winfield Scott Schley, Rear Admiral in the United States Navy from Maryland
 Henry Clay Caldwell, Federal Judge from Arkansas
 Alton B. Parker, Chief Judge from New York
 Benjamin F. Shively, Former Representative from Indiana
 George Dewey, Admiral of the Navy from Vermont
 William Randolph Hearst, Business magnate from New York
 William Frederick "Buffalo Bill" Cody, soldier, bison hunter and showman from Colorado
 Augustus Van Wyck, Former Court Justice from New York

People's Party nomination
As the nation's third largest party, the Populists had made an organizational decision in 1896 to "fuse" with the Democratic Party on the national level - their identity kept separate by the nomination of two different candidates for vice-president. At the state level, local Populist parties were left at liberty to proceed as they saw fit. In the Plains states, the Populists fused with the Democrats, and in some states replaced them entirely. In the South, the Populists fused with the Republican Party. The end result, though Bryan was defeated, was that the Populists greatly enlarged their representation in Congress, from 10 to 26. In several southern states, however, the legislatures were still controlled by the Democrats, and they began passing a series of laws to eliminate the franchise for black voters, with the intention of undermining a significant bloc of the Populist vote. The move had its intended consequences, as in the mid-term election of 1898, Populist representation in the House of Representatives fell to 9, its lowest since the party's founding.

The treatment of Populists by the Democratic Party led to a division in the party. On May 17, 1899, Populist Party leaders met in St. Louis and issued an address calling for a "Middle of the Road" policy, in which the party would decline future fusion efforts. The statement was primarily aimed at the party's national chairman, U.S. Senator Marion Butler of North Carolina, who had been elected to the Senate through fusion with North Carolina Republicans, and was already working for the re-nomination of William J. Bryan by the Populists in 1900. The pro-fusion leaders of the Populists fought back in early 1900. The first state party known to have split was the Nebraska party, which divided during its state convention on March 19. Both factions appointed delegates to the national convention, scheduled for Cincinnati. Ultimately, the Fusion Populists decided to hold a separate national convention when it became apparent that the Ohio Populists did not favor fusion, and were working to organize a convention which would not nominate Bryan, but an independent ticket.

"Fusion" Populist nomination 

The "Fusion" Populist National Convention assembled in a large tent just west of Sioux Falls, South Dakota, on May 9, and unanimously nominated Bryan for the presidency. Charles Towne, the leader of the Silver Republican Party, was near unanimously nominated as his running mate, facing only weak opposition from Representative John Lentz from Ohio. When Adlai Stevenson won the Democratic vice-presidential nomination over Towne, Towne withdrew from the race, with the Fusion Populists endorsing Stevenson.

"Middle of the Road" Populist nomination

Meeting in Cincinnati, Ohio, the "Middle of the Road" faction adopted a platform that called for the creation of fiat money, government ownership of key industries, and the opening of conservation lands for economic development. Businessman Wharton Barker was nominated for the presidency, while Representative Ignatius Donnelly was chosen as his running mate.

Minor party nominations

Social Democratic Party nomination

Social Democracy of America was founded by in June 1897, and was later reformed as the Social Democratic Party of America in 1898 while the Socialist Labor Party of America was having internal struggles. James F. Carey, who had been elected to the city council in Haverhill, Massachusetts, was expelled from the Socialist Labor Party. Eugene V. Debs, Carey, and Sylvester Keliher founded the Social Democratic Party. Carey and Louis M. Scates were elected to the Massachusetts House of Representatives while John C. Chase was elected as mayor of Haverhill. Victor L. Berger led the party in Milwaukee, Wisconsin, and a slate of candidates received almost six percent of the vote in the 1898 election. Twenty members had been elected to office by 1900.

Morris Hillquit and members of his faction, the Kangaroos, in the Socialist Labor Party attempted to oust Daniel De Leon from the party's leadership at the 1899 convention. The Kangaroo faction was removed from the party and formed their own Socialist Labor Party. The Kangaroo faction lost a court case against De Leon for control of the party. They nominated Job Harriman for president and Max S. Hayes for vice president although they were not meant to run in the 1900 election and were instead used for a compromise with the Social Democratic Party of America.

The Social Democrats had been invited to the Kangaroo's convention, but declined although the Social Democrats supported unity between the parties. The Social Democratic National Executive Board allowed for the Kangaroo faction to send delegates to its national convention. The Kangaroos passed a resolution supporting unity and created a unity committee. Sixty-seven delegates from thirty-two states attuned the 1900 convention and voted by acclamation to give their presidential nomination to Debs. Hayes and Harriman were both nominated for the vice-presidential nomination and Harriman won it.

The executive board announced on May 12, 1900, that they would not support unity with the Kangaroos after accusing them of being too dogmatic and impeding an unity referendum. The Kangaroo unity committee sent out sent out ballots to members of both groups and both voted in favor of unity. The Kangaroos nominated Debs and Harriman as their presidential ticket which Debs accepted on July 31. Debs and George D. Herron started the party's campaign on September 29, at Chicago's Music Hall. Debs received 87,945 votes with his largest amount of support coming from New York and Illinois. Debs received over ten times the amount of votes in Chicago that the Socialist Labor Party had in the 1896 election. Debs received more votes than any presidential ticket from the Socialist Labor Party. The Kangaroo faction and the Social Democrats later merged into the Socialist Party of America in 1901.

Prohibition Party nomination

Other candidates

The Prohibition Party met in Chicago, Illinois on June 28 to nominate their presidential ticket. Hale Johnson, who had been their vice-presidential nominee in 1896, withdrew his name immediately before the balloting was to begin. John G. Woolley was nominated on the first ballot, with Henry B. Metcalf of Rhode Island nominated to be his running mate in short order.

Lincoln Republican nomination

The Lincoln Republican Party, formerly the Silver Republican Party, had by 1900 come to recognize that the issue of bimetallism had been superseded by that of imperialism, and it was hoped that a broader platform in line with the perceived values of Abraham Lincoln would allow the Party to evolve beyond its singular issue of free silver.

The Lincoln Republicans assembled in Kansas City, Missouri, at the same time as the Democratic National Convention held in the same city. Committed to endorsing William Jennings Bryan for the Presidency, the primary aim of many of those attending was to promote the nomination of national chairman Charles Towne for the Vice Presidency by the Democratic Party, an effort endorsed by Fusionist Populists who had nominated Towne to the same position two months earlier. Unfortunately for those who boomed Towne these efforts may have backfired, pushing away Democratic delegates who might have otherwise been favorable to Towne by presenting the ticket of Bryan and Towne as a fait accompli, with Southern Democratic delegates themselves preferring a Vice-Presidential nominee who'd appeal to voters the Democratic Party lost in the Northeast and Midwest four years prior. Hopes for a personal endorsement of Towne by Bryan were also dashed when Bryan, who personally preferred Towne of those candidates in running and was expected to make mention of this in an acceptance, decided against going to the Convention or involving himself in the Vice-Presidential contest. Ultimately, Towne was a distant third, with Adlai Stevenson winning the nod.

The nomination of Stevenson, who'd previously served as Grover Cleveland's vice president, outraged many of the Lincoln Republicans still in attendance, and in the ensuing pandemonium attempts were made to nominate Charles Towne for the Vice Presidency. Only when Charles Towne himself addressed the convention did the anger settle. Declining the efforts to nominate him, Towne pleaded with the delegates present to accept and support the Democratic ticket as it was, noting that Bryan was at the head of it and much of the Democratic Platform was aligned with that of the Lincoln Republicans. Others, such as Senator Fred Dubois, Senator Henry Teller, and John Shafroth made similar speeches calling for support for Bryan and Stevenson. It was eventually decided that the question of the vice presidential nomination would be handled by the National Committee. They would formalize and endorsement of Adlai Stevenson for the Vice Presidency the following day, in deference to Towne's wishes.

Anti-Imperialist League nomination

The American Anti-Imperialist League had been formed in 1898 in opposition to the acquisition of the Philippine Islands, considering its annexation violating the concept of "consent of the governed". While not formalized as a political party, there existed a movement within the League that sought to nominate an independent ticket to run solely on the platform of anti-imperialism or, barring that, to endorse whichever Republican or Democratic presidential nominee that was themselves anti-imperialist. Upon the nominations of McKinley and Bryan however, there were immediate divisions on whether to endorse Bryan and the Democratic Platform, many sympathizing Republicans and Gold Democrats finding it anathema to their own political philosophies beyond its denouncement of imperialism; already by July some were considering supporting McKinley in November. Later that same month a call was made for a National Convention to meet in Indianapolis on August 15 with the intention of either endorsing or nominating a ticket for the general election. Discussions were held with remnants of National Democratic Party about the possibility of a fusion ticket, but this was voted down by their national committee. Then discussed names for possible presidential candidates were former Speaker Thomas Reed, former Secretary of State Richard Olney, former Massachusetts Governor George Boutwell, and former Senator John Henderson

From the beginning the headwinds were in Bryan's favor, with permanent President George Boutwell addressing the convention and calling for the endorsement of the Democratic ticket, this followed in speeches by former General John Beatty, Edgar Bancroft, and Gamaliel Bradford. The resolution to endorse Bryan however was subject to prolonged debate, its principal opponents being representatives of the "third-ticket" movement led by Thomas Osborne. Osborne and those who followed him theorized that many anti-imperialists would not be willing to vote for Bryan or in favor of the Democratic Platform, and would be better served by a candidate of their own. Charles Codman, the author of the resolution, and Edwin Burritt Smith countered that all issues were secondary to the issue of imperialism, and that the most effective means by which to put an anti-imperialist in office should be used. In a voice vote, the Platform of the "Liberty Congress" as it was then known as adopted overwhelmingly, with all amendments to strike the endorsement of the Bryan/Stevenson ticket being voted down. Osborne and other "third-ticketers" would then bolt to the then nearby organizing National Party.

National Party nomination

The National Party was an outgrowth of the "third-ticket" movement that existed within the Anti-Imperialist League. The first steps towards its formation were taken after the failure of a number of anti-imperialists, among them Thomas Osborne and John Jay Chapman, to convince the National Democratic Party to either nominate or endorse a third party ticket. A statement was then released by the attending League delegates from New York, denouncing both the Republican and Democratic parties, advocating for the independence of the Philippines and Porto Rico (sic), supporting gold standard and a sound banking system, calling for the abolition of special privileges, and demanding a public service based on merit exclusively. They also called for a national convention to be held from August 14 to 15, which would have placed it alongside the "national" League Convention that was being held from August 15 to August 16.

As the delegates arrived in Indianapolis, it was hoped that the League could be convinced to nominate a third party ticket, with the National Party then offering its endorsement. It swiftly became clear however that the majority of the delegates to the Anti-Imperialist League Convention were in sympathy with Bryan and prepared to endorse him, and attempts on the part of anti-Bryan delegates to kept the platform at least non-committal on the subject of the presidential race were unsuccessful. Those League delegates that were associated with the National Party then left and proceeded to elect Thomas Osborne as Permanent Chairman, calling for a new national convention to be held on September 5. It is claimed that at the time the National Party presidential nomination was offered to Moorfield Storey, but Storey declined and ultimately opted to run as an Anti-Imperialist Independent in the 11th District of Massachusetts; William Jackson Palmer was suggested as a vice-presidential nominee to run alongside him.

Meeting in Carnegie Hall (then Chamber Music Hall) on 5 September, the National Party was formalized, nominating Senator Donelson Caffery of Louisiana for the Presidency, and historian Archibald Howe of Massachusetts for the Vice Presidency. Though there was some concern over whether Caffery would accept the nomination if offered, Osborne claimed that he had been communicating with Caffrey and that he was both sympathetic to the National Party and willing to be their candidate for the Presidency. The party platform was virtually identical to the one offered by the League committee back in July, though the definition of "special privileges was defined as "subsidies, bounties, undeserved pensions, or trust-busting tariffs." A strategy was also adopted where, in those States where it was impractical to nominate a full slate of electors, a single elector would be nominated instead, allowing for voters to vote the Nationalist ticket as well as one other of their choice; it was hoped that this might avail concerns that the Nationalists would take votes away from either Bryan or McKinley, depending on the voters' sympathies.

Unfortunately for the Nationalist Party Senator Cafferty declined the nomination some weeks later, resulting in a scramble where Arthur Briggs Farquhar, owner of the Pennsylvania Agricultural Works, was considered as a possible replacement. A day later, on September 21, the Massachusetts branch of the Party voted to disband. It was then hoped that unpledged electors could be nominated, but papers were only ever taken out for one, Edward Waldo Emerson of Massachusetts.

Other nominations

The Union Reform Party nominated Seth H. Ellis of Ohio for president and Samuel T. Nicholson for vice president.

The United Christian Party nominated Jonah F. R. Leonard for president, and David H. Martin for vice president. Initially, the party had nominated Silas C. Swallow for president and John G. Woolley for vice president, but both men refused, choosing instead to contest the Prohibition Party nomination (of which Woolley would emerge the victor).

General election

Campaign

The economy was booming in 1900, so the Republican slogan of "Four More Years of the Full Dinner Pail," combined with victory in the brief Spanish–American War in 1898, had a powerful electoral appeal. Teddy Roosevelt had become a national hero fighting in Cuba during the war, and as such he was a popular spokesman for the Republican ticket.  Roosevelt proved highly energetic, and an equal match for William Jennings Bryan's famous barnstorming style of campaigning. Roosevelt's theme was that McKinley had brought America peace and prosperity and deserved re-election. In a whirlwind campaign, Roosevelt made 480 stops in 23 states. In his speeches, he repeatedly argued that the war had been just and had liberated the Cubans and Filipinos from Spanish tyranny:

Bryan's campaign was built around a reprise of his major issue from the 1896 campaign: Free Silver. It was not as successful in 1900, because prosperity had replaced severe depression and McKinley claimed credit. Advocates of enlarging the money supply to raise prices had to admit that a great deal of new gold was flowing into the world economy, and deflation (i.e. falling prices) was no longer a threat. Bryan's second major campaign theme attacked McKinley's imperialism; Bryan had supported the war, but opposed the annexation of the Philippines. He said McKinley had simply replaced a cruel Spanish tyranny with a cruel American one. Bryan was especially harsh in his criticisms of the American military effort to suppress a bloody rebellion by Filipino guerillas. This theme won over some previous opponents, especially "hard money" Germans, former Gold Democrats, and anti-imperialists such as Andrew Carnegie.

Both candidates repeated their 1896 campaign techniques, with McKinley campaigning again from the front porch of his home in Canton, Ohio. At the peak of the campaign, he greeted sixteen delegations and 30,000 cheering supporters in one day. Meanwhile, Bryan took to the rails again, traveling 18,000 miles to hundreds of rallies across the Midwest and East. This time, he was matched by Theodore Roosevelt, who campaigned just as energetically in 24 states, covering 21,000 miles by train.

The triumph of the American army and navy in the war against Spain was a decisive factor in building Republican support. Democrats tried to argue that the war was not over because of the insurgency in the Philippines; this became their major issue. A perception that the Philippine–American War was coming to an end would be an electoral asset for the Republicans, and the McKinley administration stated that there were reductions of troops there. Republicans pledged that the fighting in the Philippines would die down of its own accord within sixty days of McKinley's re-election.
However, as one lieutenant explained in a letter to his wife, "It looks good on paper, but there really has been no reduction of the force here. These battalions [being sent home] are made up on men...about to be discharged."

In addition, Secretary of War Elihu Root had a report from MacArthur of September 1900 that he did not release until after the election. General Arthur MacArthur, Jr., had been in command of the Philippines for four months, warning Washington that the war was not lessening and that the end was not even in sight. MacArthur believed that the guerrilla stage of the war was just beginning and that Filipinos were refining their techniques through experience. Furthermore, Philippine leader Emilio Aguinaldo's strategy had popular support. MacArthur wrote:

Nonetheless, the majority of soldiers in the Philippines did not support Bryan. Any mention of the election of 1900 in the soldiers' letters and diaries indicated overwhelming support for the Republican ticket of McKinley and Roosevelt. According to Sergeant Beverly Daley, even the "howling Democrats" favored McKinley. Private Hambleton wrote, "Of course, there are some boys who think Bryan is the whole cheese, but they don't say too much."

Despite Bryan's energetic efforts, the renewed prosperity under McKinley, combined with the public's approval of the Spanish–American War, allowed McKinley to gain a comfortable victory.

Results

Theodore Roosevelt, the vice-presidential candidate on the Republican ticket, attracted unusual attention in the campaign, and it has been commonly asserted that he brought a considerable number of votes to the Republican ticket.

McKinley polled roughly 7,200,000 votes. He carried 28 states with a combined 292 electoral votes (65.32%). He slightly increased his national percentage (51.60%) with 120,000 more votes than in 1896. This change is reflected in the gains made in number of counties carried; McKinley had 222 more counties than he had carried in 1896, thus gaining a slight majority of the total number of counties making returns in 1900.

Of the 2,729 counties making returns, McKinley won in 1,385 (50.75%) while Bryan carried 1,340 (49.10%). Two counties (0.07%) were split evenly between McKinley and Bryan, while two counties (0.07%) in Texas recorded more votes cast for "Other(s)" than either of the two-party candidates. McKinley had a majority in 1,288 counties while Bryan had a majority in 1,253 counties.

Further examination reveals that changes in counties were even more impressive. Of the 2,729 counties making returns, 2,286 were identical in these two elections; 113 changed from Republican to Democratic; and 328 changed from Democratic to Republican.

A notable feature was the Bryan gains made in the New England and (Northeastern) Mid-Atlantic sections, with also a slight gain in the East North Central section. Bryan even managed to win New York City by almost 30,000 votes when he had lost it by more than 60,000 votes just 4 years earlier. In all other sections, Bryan's vote was less than in 1896, and in the nation his total vote was 23,000 less than in 1896. The percentage of total was 45.52, a slight loss. Kentucky, which he carried this time, showed an increase of 17,005. In 16 states, the Democratic vote increased, but in 29 states it was less than in 1896. Bryan carried only 17 states. This was the only one of his three runs in which he failed to carry his home state of Nebraska.

This was the last election in which the Republicans won the majority of electoral votes in Maryland until 1920. It is also the last election in which a Republican won the presidency without winning Idaho and Montana. In addition, this would also be the last election in 100 years when the Republican candidate would win without earning a minimum of 300 electoral votes. That did not occur again until George W. Bush narrowly defeated Al Gore in the 2000 United States Presidential Election.

Source (popular vote): 

Source (electoral vote):

Geography of results

Cartographic gallery

Results by state

Close states
Margin of victory less than 5% (42 electoral votes):
Kentucky, 1.71% (7,994 votes)
Utah, 2.29% (2,133 votes)
Nebraska, 3.24% (7,822 votes)
Idaho, 3.83% (2,216 votes)
Indiana, 3.99% (26,479 votes)

Margin of victory between 5% and 10% (150 electoral votes):
Maryland, 5.27% (13,947 votes)
Missouri, 5.53% (37,830 votes)
Kansas, 6.60% (23,354 votes)
Ohio, 6.64% (69,036 votes)
Tennessee, 8.08% (22,132 votes)
Illinois, 8.39% (94,924 votes) (tipping point state)
North Carolina, 8.46% (24,736 votes)
Delaware, 8.77% (3,683 votes)
New York, 9.27% (143,551 votes)
West Virginia, 9.52% (21,022 votes)

Statistics
Counties with highest percent of vote (Republican)
Keweenaw County, Michigan 92.24%
Leslie County, Kentucky 91.23%
Unicoi County, Tennessee 89.64%
Scott County, Tennessee 89.59%
Johnson County, Tennessee 89.20%

Counties with highest percent of vote (Democratic)
Irion County, Texas 100.00%
Hampton County, South Carolina 99.89%
Greenwood County, South Carolina 99.73%
Saluda County, South Carolina 99.45%
Abbeville County, South Carolina 99.42%

Counties with highest percent of vote (Other)
Carson County, Texas 78.71%
Chambers County, Texas 44.50%
Comanche County, Texas 32.82%
Franklin County, Georgia 30.92%
Scurry County, Texas 28.69%

Counties with lowest percent of vote (Republican)
Randall County, Texas 00.00%
Irion County, Texas 00.00%
Hampton County, South Carolina 00.11%
Greenwood County, South Carolina 00.27%
Dooly County, Georgia 00.35%

Counties with lowest percent of vote (Democratic)
Keweenaw County, Michigan 06.33%
Unicoi County, Tennessee 08.29%
Leslie County, Kentucky 08.46%
Scott County, Tennessee 10.23%
Johnson County, Tennessee 10.42%

Counties with most votes (Republican)
Cook County, Illinois 203,760
Philadelphia County, Pennsylvania 173,657
New York County, New York 153,001
Kings County, New York 108,977
Allegheny County, Pennsylvania 71,780

Counties with most votes (Democratic)
Cook County, Illinois 186,193
New York County, New York 181,786
Kings County, New York 106,232
Philadelphia County, Pennsylvania 58,179
Suffolk County, Massachusetts 47,534

Counties with most votes (Other)
New York County, New York 11,700
Cook County, Illinois 10,242
Milwaukee County, Wisconsin 5,857
Kings County, New York 4,639
Essex County, Massachusetts 4,242

Counties with lowest percent of vote and win (Republican)
Cherokee County, Alabama 41.94%
Paulding County, Georgia 46.00%
Logan County, Colorado 46.59%
Chattahoochee County, Georgia 47.18%
Otter Tail County, Minnesota 47.19%

Counties with lowest percent of vote and win (Democratic)
Murray County, Georgia 45.18%
Geneva County, Alabama 46.48%
Douglas County, Georgia 46.75%
Linn County, Oregon 46.77%
Fresno County, California 47.41%

See also
History of the United States (1865–1918)
 Newspaper endorsements in the 1900 United States presidential election
1900 United States House of Representatives elections
1900–01 United States Senate elections
Second inauguration of William McKinley

References

Bibliography

Secondary sources
 Willis J. Abbot et al.: The Battle of 1900; an official hand-book for every American citizen

 Fahey, James J. "Building Populist Discourse: An Analysis of Populist Communication in American Presidential Elections, 1896–2016." Social Science Quarterly 102.4 (2021): 1268-1288. online

 Hilpert, John M. (2015) American Cyclone: Theodore Roosevelt and His 1900 Whistle-Stop Campaign (U Press of Mississippi, 2015). xii, 349 pp.

Primary sources
 Bryan, William Jennings. "The Election of 1900," pp. 788–801 Bryan gives his analysis of why he lost
 Stevenson, Adlai E., et al. "Bryan or McKinley? The Present Duty of American Citizens," The North American Review Vol. 171, No. 527 (Oct. 1900), pp. 433–516 in JSTOR political statements by politicians on all sides, including Adlai E. Stevenson, B. R. Tillman, Edward M. Shepard, Richard Croker, Erving Winslow, Charles Emory Smith, G. F. Hoar, T. C. Platt, W. M. Stewart, Andrew Carnegie, and James H. Eckels
 Chester, Edward W  A guide to political platforms (1977) online
 Porter, Kirk H. and Donald Bruce Johnson, eds. National party platforms, 1840-1964 (1965) online 1840-1956

External links

 Presidential Election of 1900: A Resource Guide from the Library of Congress
 Opper cartoons for 1900 election ridiculing TR and McKinley as pawns of Trusts and Sen. Hanna
1900 popular vote by counties
1900 State-by-state Popular vote
 Election of 1900 in Counting the Votes 

 
Philippine–American War
Presidency of William McKinley
William McKinley
Theodore Roosevelt
William Jennings Bryan
November 1900 events